Mimainiai is a village in Jonava district municipality, in Kaunas County, in central Lithuania. According to the 2001 census, the village has a population of 166 people. Village established near Mimainiai Lake.

References

Villages in Jonava District Municipality